Bytča District (okres Bytča) is a district in
the Žilina Region of central Slovakia. The district had been first established in 1923 and in its current borders exists from 1996. Its administrative center is its largest town Bytča. The district profits from the close distance to the regional capital Žilina.

Municipalities

References

External links 
Official site

Districts of Slovakia
Žilina Region